Donacoscaptes validus is a moth in the family Crambidae. It was described by Zeller in 1877. It is found in Panama.

References

Haimbachiini
Moths described in 1877